Ioannes VIII (Iōannēs Ē') may refer to:

 Patriarch John VIII of Constantinople (r. 1064–1065)
 John VIII Palaiologos, Byzantine Emperor (1392–1448)

See also
 John VIII (disambiguation)